Francesco Colombo (born 22 June 1973) is an Italian gymnast. He competed at the 1996 Summer Olympics.

References

External links
 

1973 births
Living people
Italian male artistic gymnasts
Olympic gymnasts of Italy
Gymnasts at the 1996 Summer Olympics
People from Carate Brianza
Sportspeople from the Province of Monza e Brianza